The number 1289 (twelve hundred eighty-nine) is the natural number following 1288 and preceding 1290.

In mathematics
The number 1289 is an odd prime number, following 1283 and preceding 1291.  It is classified as an apocalyptic power, a deficient number, and an evil number:

 The number 1289 is called an apocalyptic power because 21289 contains the consecutive digits 666 (in decimal), as the Number of the beast: in the sequence ..., 1281, 1285, 1286, 1289, 1290, 1298, 1301, etc.

 The number 1289 is a deficient number because the sum of all its positive divisors (except itself) totals less than 1289. Compare with perfect and abundant numbers.
 The number 1289 is an evil number because it has an even number of 1's contained in its binary expansion.

In technology
 1289 is a 4.5 volt battery with 3 "B Size" cells in flat side-by-side format with brass-strip connections, also known as MN1203, 3LR12 and many other IEC "R12" variations. Used in Rear cycle lamps, hand torches and in pairs in many Continental European Radio models.

Historical years
 1289 AD, 1289 BC.

Notes

Integers